Toivo Robert Tikkanen (15 April 1888 – 1 June 1947) was a Finnish sport shooter who competed in the 1920 Summer Olympics and in the 1924 Summer Olympics. He was born in Rome, Italy and died in Helsinki. 1908-1911 Tikkanen played icehockey in  Akademischer Sport Club Dresden team in Germany.

1920 Antwerp

In 1920 he won the silver medal as member of the Finnish team in the team running deer, single shots event and the bronze medal in the team running deer, double shots competition.

In the 1920 Summer Olympics he also participated in the following events:

 100 metre running deer, single shots - fifth place
 Team 50 metre free pistol - eleventh place

1924 Paris

Four years later he won the bronze medal with the Finnish team in the team clay pigeons competition.

He also participated in the following events:

 Team 100 metre running deer, double shots - fourth place
 Team 100 metre running deer, single shots - fifth place
 100 metre running deer, double shots - sixth place
 100 metre running deer, single shots - 15th place
 individual trap - result unknown

References

External links

External links
Suomen Jääkiekkoliitto - history

1888 births
1947 deaths
Finnish male sport shooters
Running target shooters
Trap and double trap shooters
ISSF pistol shooters
Olympic shooters of Finland
Shooters at the 1920 Summer Olympics
Shooters at the 1924 Summer Olympics
Olympic silver medalists for Finland
Olympic bronze medalists for Finland
Olympic medalists in shooting
Medalists at the 1920 Summer Olympics
Medalists at the 1924 Summer Olympics